Water Orton is a village and civil parish in the North Warwickshire borough of Warwickshire in the West Midlands, England near the River Tame. It is located between Castle Bromwich and Coleshill, and borders the West Midlands metropolitan county boundary to the north, west and south. At the 2001 Census, the population was 3,573, falling to 3,444 at the 2011 Census. In the 2021 Census the population slightly rose to 3,487.

Etymology
Water Orton was first documented in an Assize Roll of 1262 as Overton which means farm by the bank or edge. This usage continued to be recorded through the 13th and 14th centuries, but the name Oreton is recorded in the Warwickshire Feet of Fines in 1431. Water Ouerton is used in the Parish register of Aston in 1546 and Water Ouerton al. Water Orton in the Feet of Fines of 1605 and 1652. It is now thought that Water Orton may have been included in the Domesday Book in 1086 as 'Wavre' (Over) with Castle Bromwich.

History

The oldest part of the village is centred on the western end of Old Church Road and was designated a conservation area in 1983. This area overlooking the crossing of the River Tame formed the original medieval settlement of Overton and has seen the discovery of pottery remains dating back to the 12th century. It contains a number of listed buildings including The Chestnuts, a 15th-century house with late 16th or early 17th century additions that may have been the old manor house; and Wakefield House, a timber framed house with a 17th-century main block and a 16th-century cross wing. Water Orton was originally part of the parish of Aston, forming a narrow extension of the parish along the River Tame to the north of the parish of Coleshill. Until the 14th century Water Orton's inhabitants attended ordinary church services at the chapel of ease in Castle Bromwich. 

In 1346 they built their own chapel and were granted a license to have their own priest, although they remained subject to the mother church of Aston until 1871. The original chapel no longer remains but the graveyard in Old Church Road survives, including the stone village cross dating from 1347. The present Parish Church of St Peter and St Paul was built in 1879 for £4000 to a design by Bateman and Corser. It had a spire which was dismantled in 1987 after being declared unsafe due to the effects of atmospheric pollution. Until the 1840s Water Orton was mainly an agricultural village, but this changed with the coming of the railways. Later a junction was constructed and another line was built via  to Tamworth. The lines pass through the centre of the village.

 railway station dates from 1908 and is the second station.  There were extensive sidings and much commercial traffic here, especially during and after the Second World War, until the activities of Dr Beeching in the 1960s.  An effect of the railway was to increase house building in the village. Commuters could now make the journey to Birmingham's  and Curzon Street (later ) railway stations in a shorter time than by road.  This made the village an ideal residential area for Birmingham professionals who wanted to get away from the city and live in the country. The railway also brought the Meat Industry here. There were large stock yards near the sidings and next to the Dog Inn in Marsh Lane. Cattle were offloaded from rail wagons into pens, then driven two miles down the road to butchers' slaughter houses in Castle Bromwich, where meat was provided for nearby villages.

Features
There is a grade II listed sandstone bridge which is scheduled as an ancient monument over the River Tame on the road to neighbouring Minworth.  It was built by Bishop John Vesey of Sutton Coldfield in 1520, replacing an earlier bridge that existed from at least 1469 that was recorded as being in a poor state when Reginald Boulers, the Bishop of Coventry and Lichfield, offered to issue an indulgence to anybody who would contribute to its repair.

Education 
The village is home to Water Orton Primary School. Due to the proximity of the school to the planned route of High Speed 2, it moved to new premises in 2019.

Transport
The village is close to the M6, M6 toll and M42 motorways. Water Orton railway station was built in 1842 and is located at the junction of the B4118 and Birmingham Road. The village is also served by the National Express West Midlands X13 bus to Birmingham and Chelmsley Wood via Coleshill. With effect from the 25th April 2022, occasional journeys on Diamond Bus service 76 will connect the village to Tamworth and Sutton Coldfield via Minworth.

Notable residents
Lawrence - founder of the indie band, Felt
Maurice Deebank - founder of the indie band, Felt

References

Sources

Walmley and its surroundings (Chapter VIII: Water Orton), Douglas V. Jones, 1990, Westwood Press
Water Orton Station

External links

1890 Ordnance Survey map of Water Orton
 Water Orton Parish Council

Villages in Warwickshire
Archaeological sites in Warwickshire
History of Warwickshire